Andrew David Gorman (born 13 September 1974) is a Welsh former professional footballer who played as a defender.

Career
Gorman began his career with his hometown club Cardiff City, where his grandfather Arthur Granville had been club captain during the 1930s. After progressing through the club's youth system, he made twelve league appearances between 1991 and 1993, scoring once in a 3–3 draw with York City. However, he was released after the club won promotion to the Second Division. He later played for Yeovil Town, Barry Town and Merthyr Tydfil.

In January 2006, Gorman was appointed assistant manager at Welsh Premier League side Cardiff Grange Harlequins.

Later life
Gorman went on to work as an account manager for drinks firm Stella Artois.

References

1974 births
Living people
Welsh footballers
Footballers from Cardiff
Cardiff City F.C. players
Yeovil Town F.C. players
Barry Town United F.C. players
Merthyr Tydfil F.C. players
English Football League players
Cymru Premier players
Association football defenders